Rahmetullah Berişbek (born 22 March 1999) is a Turkish professional footballer who plays as a midfielder for Giresunspor.

Professional career
Rahmetullah joined the Gençlerbirliği youth academy in 2012. He began his senior career with Gençlerbirliği in 2018, signing a professional contract. He made his professional debut for Gençlerbirliği in a 3-2 Süper Lig loss to Kayserispor on 15 April 2018. On 31 May 2022, he transferred to Giresunspor.

International career
Rahmetullah is a youth international for Turkey, having played for the Turkey U19s and U21s.

References

External links
 
 
 
 Gençlerbirliği Profile

1999 births
Living people
People from Elmadağ, Ankara
Turkish footballers
Turkey youth international footballers
Gençlerbirliği S.K. footballers
Giresunspor footballers
Süper Lig players
TFF First League players
Association football midfielders